Manonichthys alleni, the Sabah dottyback is a species of ray-finned fish from the family Pseudochromidae, the dottybacks. It occasionally makes its way into the aquarium trade. This dottyback has only been known from Indonesia and Malaysia, but was recently recorded in Davao Gulf in the southern Philippines. The specific name honours the ichthyologist Gerald R. Allen of the Western Australian Museum in Perth who collected the type specimen and provided photographs of this species which Gill used in his description, as well as being in recognition of Allen's contribution to the knowledge of Indo-Pacific fish and of the support Allen gave  Gill in is work on the Pseudochromidae.

See also 
List of marine aquarium fish species

References

alleni